The Luoxiao Mountains are a system of mountain ranges in the People's Republic of China that straddle Jiangxi, Hubei, and Hunan provinces.

Subranges
Among other smaller ranges, the Luoxiao Mountains include the following subranges:
Wugong Mountains (Wu-Kung) 
Jinggang Mountains
Jiugong Mountains 
Jiuling Mountains 
Mufu Mountains

References

External links

Mountain ranges of Hubei
Mountain ranges of Hunan
Mountain ranges of Jiangxi
Geography of Central China
Geography of East China